Michał Paweł Dworczyk (born 22 July 1975) is a Polish politician. Dworczyk worked as an adviser for Eastern European and Polonia affairs for Prime Ministers Kazimierz Marcinkiewicz and Jarosław Kaczyński between 2005 and 2007, and later served as an adviser to President Lech Kaczyński from 2009 to 2010. In the 2015 parliamentary election, Dworczyk was elected to the Sejm as a member of the Law and Justice party.

Between March and December 2017, Dworczyk served Deputy Minister of National Defence.

In December 2017, Prime Minister Mateusz Morawiecki appointed Dworczyk as the Chief of the Chancellery.

External links

 Parliamentary profile

1975 births
University of Warsaw alumni
Law and Justice politicians
Polish Scouts and Guides
Councillors in Warsaw
Living people
Members of the Polish Sejm 2011–2015
Members of the Polish Sejm 2019–2023